Howard Ben Tré (May 13, 1949 - June 20, 2020) was an American glass artist. He worked with poured glass, creating small sculptures and large scale public artworks. Glass magazine has called Ben Tré a pioneer in the technique of using hot glass casting in fine art.

Personal life and education

Howard Ben Tré was born May 13, 1949 in Brooklyn, New York. In the 1960s he attended Brooklyn College for two years and was a political activist.

In the 1970s he left New York with his wife, Gay, for Oregon. At Portland State University he learned about the university's well-known glass-blowing shop and began studying the creation process, finding influence in religious objects. He would obtain his bachelor's degree at Portland State. Dale Chihuly recruited Ben Tré to the Rhode Island School of Design (RISD) from Portland, Oregon where he would graduate with a Masters of Fine Arts in 1980.

His wife Gay Ben Tré was actively involved in planning and siting the installation of his art. They divorced amicably and remained friends for the rest of his life. He married Wendy MacGaw in 2004. He lived and worked in Pawtucket, Rhode Island.

Howard Ben Tré died June 20, 2020 in hospice care at his home in Pawtucket, Rhode Island.

Artistic career

He started blowing glass. Through his education at Portland State University, he would discover the process of pouring glass. Pulling inspiration from African and Japanese religious icons and figures, he uses his artwork to explore connections between the two.

Ben Tré utilized his training as an industrial manufacturing master technician to create glass artworks based on traditional methods. His studio space, located in Pawtucket, Rhode Island is where he designed, made molds and completed his work. Casting at industrial facilities in New York, Pennsylvania and Prague. He created fine art castings by pouring molten glass into sand molds, applying heat and then cooling them for months. The form is then dug out from the sand mold, sand blasted, cut, ground, and polished. Many of Ben Tré's works involve the use of gold leaf; by way of wrapping portions of works or installing lead bars within the pieces covered with gold leaf. The glass sculptures are often symmetrical. His wife, Gay, assisted in the designing and planning of his large scale works, including the installation of his public art.

Reception

In lieu of Ben Tré's 2001 exhibition at the Orange County Museum of Art, critic Roberta Carasso described his work as being "part of the glass revolution". The Christian Science Monitor described his poured glass works as timeless, monumental and "hulking, architectural forms he creates...existed before the dawn of recorded history." Arthur Danto stated in 2000 that Ben Tré's glass works were redefining and powerful, and that he creates "a kind of pleasure that we don't usually associate with art."

Notable collections & installations

Caryatids, 1998, Hunter Museum of American Art, Chattanooga, Tennessee
Immanent Circumstance, 1991, Norman Leventhal Park, Boston, Massachusetts
Kira's Benches, 2007, Hood Museum of Art, Hanover, New Hampshire
Mantled Figure, 1993, Rhode Island School of Design Museum, Providence, Rhode Island
Siphon, 1989, Metropolitan Museum of Art, New York, New York
Untitled, Artery Plaza, Bethesda, Maryland
Various works; Corning Museum of Glass, Corning, New York
Water Forest, Museum of Glass, Tacoma, Washington

Notable exhibitions

Design Visions, 1992, Art Gallery of Western Australia, Perth, Australia
Masters of Contemporary Glass, 1997, Indianapolis Museum of Art, Indianapolis, Indiana
Interior/Exterior, 2000, Palm Springs Desert Museum, Palm Springs, California
Howard Ben Tré: Sculpting Space in the Public Realm, 2001, Minneapolis Institute of Arts, Minneapolis, Minnesota
Solo exhibition; 2002, Charles Cowles Gallery, New York, New York
Private Visions, Utopian Ideals: The Art of Howard Ben Tré, 2005, State University of New York at Buffalo, Buffalo, New York

Further reading

Calo, Carole Gold. "Public Art / Private Art: Dichotomy or Intersection?." Public Art Review 15.1 (2003): 4-10.
D.K. "Howard Ben Tre." Artforum International 35.7 (1997): 91.
Danto, Arthur C., Mary Jane Jacob and Patterson Sims. Howard Ben Tré. Manchester: Hudson Hills Press (1999). 
French, Meghann & Eleanor Heartney. Private Visions, Utopian Ideals: The Art of Howard Ben Tre. Buffalo: University of Buffalo (2005). 
Jepson, Barbara. "The Gallery: Community Through Glass." Wall Street Journal - Eastern Edition 18 Oct. 2001: A24.
Johnson, Linda L. Howard Ben Tre: Contemporary Sculpture. Washington: Phillips Collection (1989). 
Ben Tré, Howard, Diana L. Johnson and Donald B. Kusbit. Howard Ben Tré: New Work. Providence: Brown University (1993). 
Streitfeld, L. P. (Lisa P.), 1958-. "Interior Exterior Vision: A Conversation with Howard Ben Tre." Sculpture (Washington, D.C.) 21.9 (2002): 44-49.
"Vis Alchemical." Neues Glas 1 (1998): 54.

References

External links
 an interview with Ben Tré from the Wheeler School

1949 births
2020 deaths
Artists from Brooklyn
Artists from Rhode Island
American glass artists
National Endowment for the Arts Fellows
People from Pawtucket, Rhode Island
Portland State University alumni
Recipients of the Rakow Commission
Rhode Island School of Design alumni
Brooklyn College alumni